Ellen Cawker is a former South African international lawn bowler and national team manager.

Bowls career
Cawker was born in 1946 in Perth, Scotland but emigrated to Rhodesia in 1956.

In 1999 she won the fours gold medal at the Atlantic Bowls Championships with Trish Steyn, Hester Bekker and Lorna Trigwell.

Three years later in 2002, she won the silver medal in the women's pairs with Jill Hackland at the 2002 Commonwealth Games in Manchester.

She retired from international competition after the Commonwealth Games and then served as South Africa team manager until 2007 but still plays for the Margate Bowls Club.

She won the 2010 fours at the National Championships bowling for the Margate Bowls Club.

References

Living people
1946 births
South African female bowls players
Bowls players at the 2002 Commonwealth Games
Commonwealth Games medallists in lawn bowls
Commonwealth Games silver medallists for South Africa
Medallists at the 2002 Commonwealth Games